Arslanbekovo (Arışlanbäk) is a rural locality (a village) in Vostretsovsky Selsoviet, Burayevsky District, Bashkortostan, Russia. The population was 83 as of 2010. There is 1 street.

Geography 
Arslanbekovo  is located 31 km southwest of Burayevo (the district's administrative centre) by road. Kreshchenka is the nearest rural locality.

References 

Rural localities in Burayevsky District